Michael Sullivan (born 18 June 1980) is an Australian former professional rugby league footballer who played in the 2000s.

Background
Sullivan was born in Taree, New South Wales, Australia.
Michael his junior rugby league for Wingham Tigers & Taree City Bulls.

Career
Sullivan made his first grade debut for the now defunct Northern Eagles in Round 26 2000 against Auckland.  

In 2003, Sullivan joined Cronulla-Sutherland and was a consistent member of the first grade side over the next 3 seasons.  In 2006, Sullivan joined English side Warrington.

Sullivan returned to the NRL in 2008 to play with Canterbury on a 2 year contract.

After finishing his contract with Canterbury, Sullivan signed as Captain/Coach for the Orange CYMS in Group 10 Rugby League.

In Sullivan's 9 year tenure at CYMS, he has got the Club into 7 Grand Finals and won 5. The Grand Final wins were in 2010, 2011, 2013, 2015 & 2017. Sullivan is the most successful coach in CYMS 73 year history. 
In April 2018, Sullivan announced he would leave Orange CYMS to join his junior club, the Wingham Tigers.
In 2022, Sullivan was announced as the head coach for the Berkeley Vale Panthers first grade team for the 2023 season and beyond.

Off the field
One of rugby league's pin-up players, Sullivan was selected as one of Cleo magazine's 50 Most Eligible Bachelors for 2001, and was a finalist in the Sexiest Man In Rugby League competition in 2001 and 2005.

Sullivan posed with former Canterbury teammates Nick Youngquest and Daniel Holdsworth for the Gods Of Football charity calendar.

Career highlights 
Junior Club: Wingham Tigers, North Sydney Bears
First Grade Debut: Round 26, Northern Eagles v Warriors at Ericsson Stadium, 30 July,

References

External links

Michael Sullivan at the Canterbury Bulldogs official website.

1980 births
Living people
Australian rugby league coaches
Australian rugby league players
Canterbury-Bankstown Bulldogs players
Cronulla-Sutherland Sharks players
Northern Eagles players
Rugby league five-eighths
Rugby league halfbacks
Rugby league hookers
Rugby league players from Taree
Warrington Wolves players